Alejandro Amezcua Carried (born 17 April 1949) is a Mexican sprint canoer who competed in the early 1970s. He was eliminated in the repechages of the K-4 1000 m event at the 1972 Summer Olympics in Munich.

References
Sports-reference.com profile

External links

1949 births
Canoeists at the 1972 Summer Olympics
Living people
Mexican male canoeists
Olympic canoeists of Mexico
Place of birth missing (living people)
20th-century Mexican people